Lucian Nicolae Ion (born 10 March 1994 in Otopeni) is a Romanian footballer who plays as a midfielder for CS Tunari.

Honours

Club
CS Balotești
Liga III: 2013–14

References

External links
 

1994 births
Living people
Romanian footballers
Association football midfielders
Liga I players
Liga II players
Liga III players
CS Otopeni players
CS Balotești players
CS Concordia Chiajna players
CS Sportul Snagov players